309th may refer to:

309th Aerospace Maintenance and Regeneration Group, a United States Air Force storage and maintenance facility in Tucson, Arizona
309th Air Division, inactive United States Air Force organization
309th Airlift Squadron, part of the 86th Airlift Wing at Chièvres Air Base, Belgium
309th Bombardment Squadron or 525th Fighter Squadron, United States Air Force unit
309th Fighter Squadron (309 FS), part of the 56th Operations Group at Luke Air Force Base, Arizona
309th Maintenance Wing, inactive wing of the United States Air Force last based at Hill Air Force Base, Utah
309th Military Intelligence Battalion (United States) conducts initial entry, collective, and functional training
309th Rifle Division (Soviet Union), formed for the first time as a standard Red Army rifle division shortly after the German invasion

See also
309 (number)
309, the year 309 (CCCIX) of the Julian calendar
309 BC